In set theory, -induction, also called epsilon-induction or set-induction, is a principle that can be used to prove that all sets satisfy a given property. Considered as an axiomatic principle, it is called the axiom schema of set induction.

The principle implies transfinite induction and recursion. 
It may also be studied in a general context of induction on well-founded relations.

Statement 
In symbols:

Note that for the "bottom case" where  denotes the empty set , the subexpression  is vacuously true for all propositions and so that implication is proven by just proving .

In words, if a property is persistent when collecting any sets with that property into a new set (and this also requires establishing the property for the empty set), then the property is simply true for all sets. Said differently, persistence of a property with respect to set formation suffices to reach each set in the domain of discourse.

In terms of classes 
One may use the language of classes to express schemata. 
The principle then says that for any ,

Here the quantifier ranges over all sets.
In words this says that any class that contains all of its subsets is simply just the class of all sets. 

Assuming bounded separation,  is a proper class. So the property  is exhibited only by the proper class , and in particular by no set. Indeed, note that any set is a subset of itself and under some more assumptions, already the self-membership will be ruled out.

For comparison to another property, note that for a class  to be -transitive means

There are many transitive sets - in particular the set theoretical ordinals.

Related notions of induction 

If  is the universal class, then this is again just an instance of the schema.

Ordinals 
Ordinals may be defined as transitive sets of transitive sets. The induction situation in the first infinite ordinal , the set of natural numbers, is discussed in more detail below. As set induction allows for induction in transitive sets containing , this gives what is called transfinite induction and definition by transfinite recursion using, indeed, the whole proper class of ordinals. With ordinals, induction proves that all sets have ordinal rank and the rank of an ordinal is itself.

The theory of Von Neumann ordinals describes such sets and, there,  models the order relation , which classically is provably trichotomous and total. Of interest there is the successor operation  that maps ordinals to ordinals. In the classical case, the induction step for successor ordinals can be simplified so that a property must merely be preserved between successive ordinals (this is the formulation that is typically understood as transfinite induction.) The sets are -well-founded.

Well-founded relations 
It can be shown that for a well-founded relation , there are no infinite descending -sequences and so also .
Further, function definition by recursion with  can be defined on their domains, and so on.

Classically, well-foundedness of a relation on a set can also be characterized by the strong property of minimal element existence for every subset, or, with dependent choice, by the weak property of non-existence of infinite descending chains.

Constructively weaker forms of set induction

Negated predicates 
Consider set induction for  a negated predicate .
Writing  for the statement that all sets are not members of the class , one now finds

Consider the equivalence of separation statements
,
both saying that two predicates  and  can not, for any value, be validated simultaneously.
Applied to the antecedent, we may write

In words, a property such that there is no -minimal set for it is simply false for all sets.

Consequences 
Lifting one double negation in the antecedent above, one finds the antecedent is certainly implied by the stronger -statement .

Infinite descending chains 
Consider a context with dependent choice and a set  with the -property. Assuming the set is inhabited implies the existence of an infinite descending membership chain as sequence, i.e. a function on the naturals. So establishing the non-existence of such a chain implies . 

Given the extra assumptions, the postulate of mere non-existence of infinite descending chains is relatively weak compared to set induction.

For the other direction, note that in the presence of any such membership chain function, the axiom of replacement proves existence of a set  that fulfills the -property. So assuming the induction principle makes the chain existence contradictory also.

Self-membership 
For a contradiction, assume there exists an inhabited set  with a particular property introduced below. 
Characterized another way,  is the inhabited singleton set . 

The peculiar property shall be that  is equal to its own singleton set, i.e. . It follows that  and any set contained in  also contains , i.e. . 
By the previous form of the principle it follow that , a contradiction. 
Either way, .

Contrapositive 
For a general predicate instance  of the set induction schema, taking the contrapositive reads

Classical equivalents

Relation to regularity 
Classically, the above shows that set induction implies

In words, any property that is exhibited by some set is also exhibited by a "minimal set", as defined above. In terms of classes, this states that every non-empty class  has a member  that is disjoint from it. 
In first-order set theories, the common framework, the set induction principle is an axiom schema, granting an axiom for any predicate (i.e. class). In contrast, the axiom of regularity is a single axiom, formulated with a universal quantifier only over elements of the domain of discourse, i.e. over sets. Hence, assuming set induction over a classical logic (i.e. assuming the law of excluded middle), all instances of regularity hold.

In a context with an axiom of separation, regularity also implies excluded middle (for the predicates allowed in ones separation axiom). Meanwhile, the set induction schema does not imply excluded middle, while still being strong enough to imply strong induction principles, as discussed above. In turn, the schema is, for example, adopted in the constructive set theory CZF, which has type theoretic models. So within such a set theory framework, set induction is a strong principle strictly weaker than regularity. When adopting the axiom of regularity and full Separation, CZF equals standard ZF.

History 
Because of its use in the set theoretical treatment of ordinals, the axiom of regularity was formulated by von Neumann in 1925. 
Its motivation goes back to Skolem's 1922 discussion of infinite descending chains in Zermelo set theory , a theory without regularity or replacement.

The theory  does not prove all set induction instances. Regularity is classically equivalent to the contrapositive of set induction for negated statements, as demonstrated. The bridge from sets back to classes is demonstrated below.

Set induction from regularity and transitive sets 
Assuming regularity, one may use classical principles, like the reversal of a contrapositive. Moreover, an induction schema stated in terms of a negated predicate  is then just as strong as one in terms of a predicate variable , as the latter simply equals . As the equivalences with the contrapositive of set induction have been discussed, the task is to translate regularity back to a statement about a general class . It works because the axiom of separation allows for intersection between sets and classes. Regularity only concerns intersection inside a set and this can be flattened using transitive sets.

The aim is to obtain a statement that also has it replaced in the antecedent. 

So assume there is some  together with a transitive set that has  as subset. An intersection  may be constructed as described and it also has . If  is empty, then also  and  itself fulfills the principle. In this case, one even obtains a slightly stronger statement than the one in the previous section, since it carries the sharper information that  and not just .

Transitive set existence 
The existence of the required transitive sets can be postulated, the transitive containment axiom.

Existence of the stronger transitive closure with respect to membership, for any set, can also be derived from some stronger standard axioms. I.e. it needs many standard axioms, just sparing the axiom of powerset. In a context without strong separation, suitable function space principles may have to be adopted to enable recursive function definition.

Forms without implication 
Using  and double-negation elimination, the contrapositive can be further translated to the following statement:

Relating it back to the original formulation: If one can, for any set , prove that   implies , which includes a proof of the bottom case , then the failure case is ruled out and, then, by the disjunctive syllogism the disjunct  holds.

As refinement of excluded middle 
The excluded middle for predicates can be expressed as follows: Either there exist a term for which a predicate fails, or it holds for all terms

With this, using the disjunctive syllogism, ruling out the possibility of counter-examples classically proves a property for all terms. 
This purely logical principle is unrelated to other relations between terms, such elementhood (or succession, see below).
The induction principle is a stronger tool for the task of proving  by ruling out the existence of counter-examples, and it is one often also adopted in constructive frameworks.

Comparison of epsilon and natural number induction 
The transitive von Neumann model  of the standard natural numbers is the first infinite ordinal. There, the binary membership relation "" of set theory exactly models the ordering of natural numbers "". Then, the principle derived from set induction complete induction.

In this section, quantifiers are understood to range over the domain of first-order Peano arithmetic , a theory with a signature including the constant symbol "", the successor function symbol "" and the addition function symbol "". For any predicate , the principle reads

Making use of
,
complete induction is already implied by standard form of the mathematical induction schema. The latter is expressed not in terms of the decidable order relation "" but the primitive symbols,

By design this trivially holds for zero, and so, akin to the bottom case in set induction, the implication  is equivalent to just . Otherwise,  and so, for positive numbers,  expresses . Together one obtains

Classical equivalents 
Using the classical principles mentioned above, the above may be expressed as

It expresses that, for any predicate , either there is some natural number  for which  does not hold, despite  holding for all predecessors, or  hold for all numbers. 

Moreover, if a failure case exists, one can use the least number principle to even prove the existence of a minimal such failure case.

Least number principle 
As in the set theory case, one may consider induction for negated predicates and take the contrapositive. After use of a few classical logical equivalences, one obtains a conditional existence claim.

Let  denote the set of natural numbers  validating a property .
The least number principle, obtained from complete induction, here expressed in terms of sets, reads

If there is any number validating , then there (classically) is a least such number  validating it such that no number  is validating it. This should be compared with regularity.

Moreover, adopting Markov's principle in arithmetic allows removal of double-negation for decidable  in general.

See also

 Constructive set theory
 Mathematical induction
 Non-well-founded set theory
 Transfinite induction
 Well-founded induction

Mathematical induction
Wellfoundedness